Sayyidi ʻAbd al-Raḥmān ibn Muḥammad al-Ṣaghīr ibn Muḥammad ibn Sayyidi ʿĀmir al-Akẖḍarī al-Bīsīkrī Arabic :سيدي عبد الرحمن بن محمد الصغير بن محمد بن سيدي عمرو الأخضري, better known as Kabīlāt Al-Akẖḍariyah, born in 1512 in Biskra, Algeria and died in 1575 in Biskra, Algeria, was an Algerian poet, logician, astronomer and maliki jurist.

He was the author of the highly popular didactic poem Al-Sullam al-murawnaq fī ʻilm al-manṭiq ("The Ornamented Ladder into the Science of Logic"). The 144-line poem, a versification of Al-Abhari's Kitab al-Isaghuji, outlines the principles of Aristotelian logic and explains how logic could be used to support the Islamic creed ('aqidah) and jurisprudence (fiqh). The work is studied across the Muslim world as a primer on logic and is often read in conjunction with al-Akhdari's own prose commentary.

He is also known to have written another work, "al-Jawhar ul-Maknun" or "Al-Jawahir al-Maknuna fi'l-ma'ni wa'l-bayan wa'l-badi".

OriginSheikh Sayyidi'Abd al-Raḥmān ibn Muhammad al-Akẖḍarī was born in Algeria, plus an account in an Arab Algerian family Sherifian (noble descendant) of the Arab tribe Banu al-Akhdari (Arabic: بنو الأخضري) the region of Ibb in Yemen present in Algeria since the 680s, best known in Algeria and Libya as Kābilāt Al-Akḥdārīyyāh (Arabic: قبيلة الأخضرية').

See also 
 List of Ash'aris and Maturidis

References

External links
 https://web.archive.org/web/20140326072939/http://al-akhdari.com/

1514 births
1546 deaths
Asharis
Maliki fiqh scholars
Algerian Maliki scholars
Algerian male poets
Logicians
16th-century jurists